Olkusz  ( Elkish) is a town in southern Poland with 36,607 inhabitants (2014). Situated in the Lesser Poland Voivodeship (since 1999), previously in Katowice Voivodeship (1975–1998), it is the capital of Olkusz County. Olkusz is known for its abundance of silver, which is mined and extracted in the vicinity.

Surroundings 
The city is on the Baba River, a tributary of the Sztoła, with a major road reaching it from Warsaw and Kraków, making it the central city of the vicinity. Tourists who wish to visit nature and historical sites, start from here. Also, Olkusz is located on the main railroad line, which connects Upper Silesia and Zaglebie with Kielce. The Starczynów Desert is located nearby, and wind-blown sands from the desert troubled the town until the desert was planted with trees in 1949 resulting in the desert becoming overgrown.

History

On the city's website, a myth is cited that the city was founded by ancient Phoenicians (Canaanites) who traveled here and found lead ore. The origin of the name Olkusz is cited as the ancient Phoenician (Canaanite Hebrew) "Elkhuds" meaning "to chisel". However, the Hebrew word for "to chisel" was "lakhrot" and the likelihood of the ancient Phoenicians having reached Poland is very low.

A first written historical document from the year 1299 refers to the city of Olkusz, although it was granted town rights earlier. It was located within the Seniorate Province of the fragmented Kingdom of Poland, and then it was a royal town of Poland, administratively located in the Kraków Voivodeship in the Lesser Poland Province of the Polish Crown. The inhabitants were mostly wealthy, due to the lead mines. Silver was discovered too. Various wars crossed the path of this town, which was at its lowest at the end of the 17th century (see: The Deluge).

In the Third Partition of Poland (1795) the town was annexed by Austria. Following the Austro-Polish War of 1809 it was regained by Poles and included within the short-lived Duchy of Warsaw, and after the duchy's dissolution in 1815, the town fell to the Russian Partition of Poland. Fights of the Polish January Uprising took place in the area in 1863. Francesco Nullo, hero of the fights for Italian and Polish independence died in the Battle of Krzykawka nearby, and then was buried at the cemetery in Olkusz.

Poland eventually regained independence and control of the town after World War I in 1918.

During the joint German-Soviet invasion of Poland, which started World War II in September 1939, the town was invaded by Germany. Already during the invasion, the Germans committed the first executions of local Poles (see also Nazi crimes against the Polish nation).

Under German occupation, the town was annexed directly into Germany. Poles from Olkusz were among the victims of a massacre committed in Celiny in June 1940. On 16 July 1940, in retaliation for the killing of a German policeman, the Germans carried out a massacre of 20 Polish hostages. On 31 July 1940, the Germans gathered all Polish and Jewish men aged 15 to 55 and subjected them to torture and murder. The German terror campaign against the local population was aimed at the planned Germanisation of the town and the region. The occupation ended in January 1945, and the town was restored to Poland.

Sports
The town's most notable sports club is KS Olkusz with football and athletics sections.

Religions
 Roman Catholicism  4  parishes: 
 St Andrew's Basilica
 St Maximilian Maria Kolbe Church
 St Barbara's Church
 Good Shepherd Church 
 Jehovah's Witnesses
 Pentecostalism 
 Seventh-day Adventist Church
 Jewish (40% of the population before the Holocaust)

International relations

Twin Towns – Sister Cities

   Bergamo, Italy
  Schwalbach am Taunus, Germany
  Staffordshire Moorlands, United Kingdom

Notable people
 Paweł Blehm, Polish chess grandmaster
 Marcin Bylica a.k.a. Martin Bylica and Marcin z Olkusza, Polish astrologer and astronomer
 Paweł Czarnota, Polish chess Grandmaster 
 Antoni Kocjan, Polish war hero and famous glider engineer
 Henryk Mandelbaum, noted Polish survivor of the Holocaust
 Tadeusz Rydzyk, Roman Catholic priest and Redemptorist
 Rabbi Dov Berish Einhorn

References

External links 

 
 Olkusz's Internet forum
 Olkusz city website, with contemporary images
 Nature around Olkusz
 Jewish Community in Olkusz on Virtual Shtetl
 Images of the Bloody Wednesday of Olkusz (Note that the name is Rabbi Hagerman and not Hangerman.)
 Images of deportation during the holocaust WWII
 The full story of the famous Olkusz image identification 
 Olkusz -full screen gallery